MV Nazimuddin was a ferry that sunk in the Ghorautura River of Bangladesh on 13 May 2008, killing at least 40 people.

References

Ferries of Bangladesh
Maritime incidents in Bangladesh
Shipwrecks in rivers
Maritime incidents in 2008
2008 in Bangladesh
2008 disasters in Bangladesh